The 2002–03 Washington State Cougars men's basketball team represented Washington State University for the 2002–03 NCAA Division I men's basketball season. Led by third-year head coach Paul Graham, the Cougars were members of the Pacific-10 Conference and played their home games on campus at Beasley Coliseum in Pullman, Washington.

Days after the season ended, Graham was fired; his successor was Dick Bennett, formerly the head coach at

References

External links
Sports Reference – Washington State Cougars: 2002–03 basketball season

Washington State Cougars men's basketball seasons
Washington State Cougars
Washington State
Washington State